Sara Lezana Mínguez (born 5 March 1948) is a Spanish flamenco dancer, choreographer and actress.

In 1960, she made her debut on Teatro Valle Inclán in Madrid with Historia de los Tarantos, by Alfredo Mañas. Then she made her film debut on Los Tarantos with Carmen Amaya, and then she appeared in En el extraño viaje by Fernando Fernán Gómez, La búsqueda by Angelino Fons, La Carmen along Julián Mateos, Casa Manchada along Stephen Boyd, Donde hay patrón... along Manolo Escobar, and Historia de S. She appeared in Spaghetti Western films like Gunfight in the Red Sands (1963), Fall of the Mohicans (1965), and Murieta (1963). She worked with the actor Daniel Martín and the torero Palomo Linares.

In 1968 she started her own dance business, Ballet Flamenco de Madrid, and between 1970 and 1980 she worked in Japan, United States, Canada, South America and Europe. She worked with the guitarist Pepín Salazar. In 1980 she opened a property, Casa Sara, for which she worked with the guitarists Paco Izquierdo and Rafael Andújar, and the singers Antonio "Cuquito" de Barbate and Pepe el Malagueño. With the business she released Carmen at teatro Rialto, España baila flamenco at Teatro Muñoz Seca and Flamenco Feeling. El sentimiento at Teatro de las Esquinas.

Partial filmography

References

Bibliography

External links
 

1948 births
Actresses from Madrid
Spanish film actresses
Spanish television actresses
Spanish female dancers
Musical theatre female dancers
Living people